Bernese is the adjectival form for the canton of Bern or for Bern.

Bernese may also refer to:

 Bernese German, a Swiss German dialect of Alemannic origin generally spoken in the canton of Bern and its capital, and in some neighbouring regions
 Bernese Mountain Dog, a member of the Swiss mountain dog breeds

See also